Kirill Alekseevich Kleimyonov (born 20 September 1972, Moscow) is a Russian journalist, broadcaster, Deputy General Director —  Head of the Directorate of Information Programs  —  a member of the Board of Directors  of the Channel One Russia.

Following Marina Ovsyannikova's on-screen protest on Channel One Russia opposing the 2022 Russian invasion of Ukraine, Kleimyonov denounced Ovsyannikova as a British spy.

References

External links
 Биография Кирилла Клеймёнова на сайте Первого канала

1972 births
Living people
Mass media people from Moscow
Russian television presenters
Radio and television announcers
Russian journalists
Russian radio personalities
Moscow State University alumni
Russian male journalists